Ivan Nikolaevich Nepryaev (born February 4, 1982) is a Russian ice hockey forward. He currently plays for Avangard Omsk of the Kontinental Hockey League. He was selected as a prospect by the Washington Capitals in the fifth round (#163 overall) of the 2000 NHL Entry Draft.

Honours
Russian championship:  2002, 2003

Career statistics

Regular season and playoffs

International

External links

1982 births
HC Dynamo Moscow players
Ice hockey players at the 2006 Winter Olympics
Living people
Lokomotiv Yaroslavl players
Minnesota Wild scouts
Olympic ice hockey players of Russia
Russian ice hockey centres
Sportspeople from Yaroslavl
Washington Capitals draft picks